A winless season is a regular season in which a sports team fails to win any of its games. The antithesis of a perfect season, this ignominy has been suffered twelve times in professional American football, six times in arena football, three times in professional Canadian football, once each in American professional lacrosse and box lacrosse, more than twenty-five times in major Australian football leagues, over twenty times in top-level rugby league, at least twice in top-level rugby union, and twice in English county cricket.

Gridiron football
Because of the relatively small number of games played in college and professional football seasons, there is a possibility that a particularly inept team will not manage to win any games. Before overtime games in the regular season was instituted, teams might tie a game without winning a game; these are still counted in lists of winless seasons. This is because, during eras before overtime was introduced to American football, leagues generally ignored tied games when calculating winning percentage.

Because NFL teams do not all play one another each season, it is possible for multiple teams to go winless (or also, for that matter, to go undefeated in the regular season). This was common in the NFL's early years as scheduling was not standardized and teams entered and left the league regularly. Since 1935, multiple simultaneous winless seasons has only happened once, in 1944 when both Brooklyn and Card-Pitt finished 0–10 in a season where rosters had been decimated (and parity disrupted) by wartime enlistments.

National Football League

8 or more games

The Rochester Jeffersons went a combined 0–21–2 from 1922 to 1925, but played only partial NFL schedules in those years (0–4–1, 0–4, 0–7 and 0–6–1, respectively). They also had another winless season in 1911 going 0–1–3 in the New York Pro Football League.

One honorable mention is the 1980 New Orleans Saints. The team lost their first 14 games and finished with a 1–15 record. Their only win was in week 15 when they won by a single point. The second team to replicate this feat was the 2016 Cleveland Browns, who, as mentioned above, went winless the following season.

7 games or fewer

Arena football
The previously shorter length of seasons in arena football made imperfect seasons quite possible. The following teams went through an Arena Football League or a National Arena League season without winning a game:

In 2001, the Columbus Wardogs of AF2, the minor league of the AFL, made history becoming the first American football team to go 0–16.

United Football League
The United Football League had one winless season. In their inaugural season, the 2009 New York Sentinels lost all six of their games. The team, which was a traveling team that played games in Hartford, Long Island and New Jersey (and had intended to play a game in New York City but backed out), fired its head coach and settled permanently in Hartford to become the Hartford Colonials. Under the UFL's double round robin format, only one team could finish any particular season entirely with losses, since every team played each other at least twice.

World League of American Football
The 1991 inaugural season of the World League of American Football saw the Raleigh-Durham Skyhawks fold after losing all ten of their regular-season games.  The following year, the WLAF replaced that franchise with the Ohio Glory who almost met the same fate but managed one win in their lone season.

Other American football leagues

Since non-professional, semi-professional, and minor league teams are inherently unstable in their membership, it is far easier for seasons in which a team wins no games to occur. In the case of non-professional teams, neither mechanisms to force a team to shut down against its will, nor effective drafts or revenue sharing mechanisms to distribute talent evenly among teams typically exist, leading to poor teams accumulating multiple winless seasons. Four teams in football history have both lost all their games and failed to score a single point in an entire season; all played eight games or less. The 1938 Clintonville Four Wheel Drive Truckers failed to score a point in a nine-game season but managed two 0–0 ties. There are at least twelve teams who have accumulated losing streaks of 20 games or more; there are also four teams who have accumulated seasons of all losses with at least 13 games. In the case of minor professional football, particularly in indoor football leagues, winless seasons often result from an owner's abandonment or other financial hardship. The American Indoor Football Association had at least one winless team in five out of six seasons. The National Indoor Football League went its first three seasons without a winless season, but beginning in 2004, at least one team went winless every year until the league's collapse in 2007. Though the Spring Football League had two teams with winless seasons (the Los Angeles Dragons and the Miami Tropics), and the Stars Football League had one such team (the traveling 2011 Michigan Coyotes), they are almost never mentioned in discussions of perfect and perfectly bad seasons, since those teams only played two games each before the seasons were cut short.

AF2 was the minor league of the Arena Football League. In 2001, the Columbus Wardogs made history becoming the first American football team to finish a season 0–16.

The Legends Football League (originally Lingerie Football League), whose seasons are only three to four games long for each team, has had eight teams with perfectly bad seasons in three years of play. One such team, the Toronto Triumph, did not win a game in either of their competing seasons in 2011 and 2012.

The Princeton Tigers sprint football squad, a team consisting of players under 172 pounds, sustained 16 consecutive winless seasons before Princeton University shut the team down in 2015, citing safety concerns in allowing players to play on a team so heavily outmatched.

Canadian Football League
Since 1986, the Canadian Football League's regular season spans eighteen games; from 1952 to 1985 it was generally sixteen games like the NFL from 1978 to 2020, though those teams in what is now the Eastern Division played only fourteen as late as 1973. Also, the CFL did not adopt interdivisional regular season play until the early 1960s. There have been no imperfect seasons since the CFL was officially founded in 1958 (the closest any CFL team has come to a winless season since its formation are the 2003 Hamilton Tiger-Cats who went 1-17; however, there have been three other seasons in which a team won a single game under shorter standard regular season schedules since 1958) – the last imperfect season in either of the CFL's antecedent leagues was in 1949.

Imperfect seasons were common in the Canadian football during the first half of the twentieth century when fewer games were played and more leagues were challenging for the Grey Cup. There was also far more disparity between teams in early Canadian football leagues.

Also unlike the NFL, the CFL has always awarded "points" in the standings that, in effect, have always counted ties as "half-wins" so a team with only ties and losses in the standings has never been regarded as having an imperfect season.

Teams with winless seasons in the WIFU, IRFU and CFL since 1935

National Pro Grid League 
The National Pro Grid League, which operated from 2014 to 2016, has a season of 3 to 4 games per team  plus a 4 to 8 team playoff. The Los Angeles Reign lost all ten games it played during the league's (and team's) three-year existence.

NPGL  teams with no wins in a season (based on NPGL site)

Lacrosse
Seasons in the National Lacrosse League and its predecessors Major Indoor Lacrosse League and Eagle Pro Box Lacrosse League have varied from eight games in the first years of competition to sixteen games today, with the extension having been gradual. The Charlotte Cobras, who played only one season before folding, are the only team in the history of the NLL to have not won a game in a season. In their sole 1996 season they played 12 games and lost them all, before folding.

In Major League Lacrosse, the season consisted of either 12 or 14 games from the league's formation in 2001 through the 2019 season. The 2020 season, the last before MLL merged into the Premier Lacrosse League, was abbreviated due to the COVID-19 pandemic. During the existence of the MLL, two teams recorded winless seasons—the 2006 Chicago Machine, who went 0–12 and lost an MLL record 13 consecutive games, and by the 2020 New York Lizards, who went 0–5 in the shortened season.

PLL has never had a team record a completely winless season since its formation in 2019; only one team has recorded a winless regular season. During the 2020 season, also abbreviated by COVID-19, Chaos LC went 0–4 in the regular season, but won two games in the league's Championship Series (i.e., playoffs) before losing in the final to Whipsnakes LC.

Other North American leagues
In the other major professional sports leagues of North America it is virtually impossible that a team could lose all its games, for the simple reason that there are many more games in the regular season than in football or lacrosse.

Major League Soccer
The Major League Soccer schedule has consisted of between 26 and 34 games. No team in Major League Soccer has ever come close to losing all its games: the most losses in a MLS season is 24 from 32 games by the Kansas City Wizards, now known as Sporting Kansas City, in 1999, the year when the league used shootouts to decide all tied games. Shootouts were abandoned the following season. In 2013, D.C. United set new MLS records in futility. United won a league-low 3 games, and lost a record 24 games, tying the aforementioned Wizards.

National Basketball Association
Since the 1967–68 season, the National Basketball Association's standard regular season schedule has been 82 games long (except the 1998–99, 2011–12, 2019–20, and 2020–21 seasons were shortened, though all were at least 50 games).

The 2011–12 Charlotte Bobcats hold the record for the lowest winning percentage of any team in an NBA season, winning only 7 out of 66 games in a lockout-shortened season, for a winning percentage of 0.106. This broke the record held by the 1972–73 Philadelphia 76ers, who had a winning percentage of .110 in a full 82-game season. The 1947–48 Providence Steamrollers won an all-time NBA low of six games  out of 48 (.125 winning percentage).

The 1953–54 Baltimore Bullets went 0–20 on the road.  More recently, the 1990–91 Sacramento Kings managed a near-imperfect road season, winning only one of 41 away games. Overall, the Kings lost 43 consecutive road games before beating the Orlando Magic 95–93 on November 23, 1991.

Women's National Basketball Association
Since its formation in 1997, the WNBA regular season has been gradually increased from 30 to the current 36-game schedule to be used starting in 2022.

No team has gone through a WNBA season without winning a game; the fewest wins in a WNBA season has been 2 by the 2020 New York Liberty during the WNBA bubble season. The record was previously tied at 3 wins by the 1998 Washington Mystics in their first season, and the 2011 Tulsa Shock. Two other expansion WNBA teams, the 2008 Atlanta Dream at 4–30 and the 2006 Chicago Sky at 5–29, have come close to this record.

United States Basketball League
The Atlantic City Seagulls of the (now defunct) summertime, minor league USBL finished the 2001 season with an 0–28 record. It was quite a turnaround for the franchise, as they were dominant in the USBL just a few years earlier; the Seagulls were USBL runners-up in 1996, then swept to three straight titles in 1997–99. In 2000, the Seagulls slipped to 12–18, fourth place, and were beaten in the first round of the playoffs; after their winless 2001 campaign, the Seagulls folded.

National Hockey League
The National Hockey League's schedule, like that of the NBA, consists of 82 games. Since the 2004–05 lockout, teams receive two points for a win, one point for a loss in overtime or a shootout, and zero points for a loss in regulation time. From 1997 until 2004, teams received two points for a win, one point for a tie or overtime loss, and zero points for a regulation loss. Prior to 1997, teams received two points for a win, one point for a tie, and no points for a loss. 

No team has ever come close to losing every game in an NHL season; the worst record is by the 1974–75 Washington Capitals who went 8–67–5 (8 wins, 67 losses, 5 ties). The 1974–75 Capitals and 1992–93 Ottawa Senators hold the record for fewest wins on the road with one. The NHL played an 80-game season in 1974–75, whereas in 1992–93 the schedule consisted of 84 games, thus giving the Senators the percentage record for worst road record. The Senators also set a record by losing their first 38 consecutive road games (the Senators' road statistics include a neutral site game played in Hamilton, Ontario, in which the Senators were considered the road team).

Major League Baseball
Since the early 1960s, the schedule of both leagues of Major League Baseball has been 162 games long, and before that it was 154 games long. With such a large schedule, it is practically impossible for a team to finish with a winless season. The sabermetric baseball statistic Wins Above Replacement is calculated on the premise that even a team consisting entirely of replacement-level players, (i.e., a player that could be "replaced" by a call-up from the minor leagues without any significant statistical difference) is expected to win a baseline minimum number of games (typically 40–50, depending primarily on the caliber of the team's division) per 162-game season.

The closest to a perfectly imperfect season in the National League was the infamous 1899 Cleveland Spiders season, who finished with a record of 20-134 after its roster was looted by the owners of the team, who then stacked the best players onto the St. Louis Perfectos.

With a win percentage of .130, the Spiders are (as of 2020) the last of three major league teams to have finished a season below the Mendoza line (.200) in win percentage for a minimum of 120 games; the others were the 1889 Louisville Colonels (.196), and the 1890 Pittsburgh Alleghenys (.169), whose best players had jumped to the Pittsburgh Burghers of the newly formed Player's League.

Since the establishment of the American League in 1901, the teams to have come closest to imperfection are the Philadelphia Athletics in 1916 (36–117), the Boston Braves in 1935 (38–115), the New York Mets in their 1962 inaugural season (40–120), the Detroit Tigers in 2003 (43–119), the Baltimore Orioles in 2018 (47–115), and the Detroit Tigers in 2019 (47–114).

College basketball 
Compared to the NBA, the college basketball season is shorter, with teams playing up to 40 games, divided into non-conference play, conference play (both regular season), conference tournaments, and postseason tournaments. Starting in 2020, Division I teams can either play 29 or 31 regular season games, with conference play ranging from 14 to 20 games. Better performing teams play more games by qualifying to conference and postseason tournaments.

Women's NCAA Division I 
 Centenary 1999–00 0–28
 Centenary 2000–01 0–27
 Chicago State 2016–17 0–29
 Delaware State 2021–22 0–24
 Saint Peter's 2022-23 0-30

Women's NCAA Division III 
 Centenary 2013–14 0–24
 Centenary 2014–15 0–24

Men's NCAA Division I 

 NJIT 2007–08 0–29
 Grambling 2012–13 0–28

Association football
Only four teams are known to have completed a season with no victories or draws. Antigua Barracuda lost all 26 matches of the 2013 USL Pro season. Gibraltar Phoenix lost all 14 matches in the 2013–14 Gibraltar Premier Division, while in the 2015–16 season, English non-league team Longford AFC, played a 30-game season in the Gloucestershire Northern Senior League Division Two (14th tier on the English pyramid), losing all their matches after the majority of their players and manager left. In 2016, Grêmio Barueri lost all 19 matches of the Campeonato Paulista Série A3, the third level of the São Paulo state championship. After the disastrous season, the Antigua and Grêmio Barueri teams folded.

In the 2010–11 Ukrainian Second League (3rd tier on the Ukrainian pyramid), FC Veres Rivne lost all 14 out of 22 scheduled games before being expelled from the league due to failure of payment of league dues; in addition, they failed to score a single goal at home.

In top-level domestic league football however, a handful of teams have completed their respective seasons without winning a game. In the 2010–11 Serbian SuperLiga, FK Čukarički Stankom played an entire season winless, drawing five matches and losing 25 in a 30-game season, giving them only 5 points and finishing bottom in a field of 16. The team also only scored ten goals whilst conceding 65.

In the Bulgarian A Professional Football Group, which is the top tier of association football in the European country, three teams have all played a season without winning, with those being Torpedo Ruse (four draws out of 22 matches during 1951), Rakovski Ruse (one draw out of 30 matches during 1996/97) and Chernomorets Burgas Sofia (also one draw out of 30 matches during 2006/07). Chernomorets were however the worse performing out of these, conceding 131 goals with only eight in reply (the same number scored as Rakovski Ruse in their winless season), they still however completed the season with a minus 2 points total, because they violated a rule concerning not being able to field enough youth players.

In the 1946–47 Allsvenskan with 22 games played, Billingsfors IK tied 3 games and lost 19, the only team in Swedish football history never to win even one single Allsvenskan game in a season.

In the 1998–99 Alpha Ethniki, the football championship in Greece, Ethnikos Piraeus drew 8 games and lost 26 out of 34.

In the 1999–2000 Vyshcha Liha, the highest division of Ukrainian football championship, FC Zirka Kirovohrad tied 9 matches and lost 21 out of 30.

In the 2016 Thai Division 2 League Eastern Region, the third highest division of Thai football pyramid. TA Benchamarachuthit F.C. drew 5 matches and lost 17 out of 22 matches.

In the 2017–18 Scottish Championship, the second highest division of Scottish Football, Brechin City drew 4 matches and lost 32 out of 36 matches.

In the 2017–18 Gibraltar Premier Division, the highest division in Gilbraltar football championship, Manchester 62 drew 7 games and lost 20 out of 27.

In the 2018 Úrvalsdeild, the highest division in Icelandic football championship, Knattspyrnudeild Keflavík drew 4 games and lost 18 out of 22.

In the 2018–19 Football Superleague of Kosovo, the highest division in Kosovar football championship, KEK drew 1 game and lost 32 out of 33.

In the 2018–19 Campionato Sammarinese di Calcio, the football championship in San Marino, Virtus drew 2 games and lost 17 out of 19.

In the 2019–20 Slovenian PrvaLiga, the highest division in Slovenian football, Rudar Velenje drew 12 games and lost 24 out of 36, conceding a last-minute equaliser away to NK Bravo on the final day of the season.

The open high frequency of draws in association football, coupled with the relatively long length of seasons and promotion and relegation system used in a majority of jurisdictions to automatically remove the lowest performing teams from any given league, makes winless seasons less likely to occur.

Australian rules football

VFL/AFL
In the Australian Football League (until 1990 called the Victorian Football League), seasons have ranged from twelve games per team (in 1916, when only four teams competed due to World War I) to 22 games (since 1970, except for 1993 when 20 games were played), with most seasons being of 18 or 22 games duration.

AFLW
In the AFL Women's competition, seasons have ranged from six games per team (in 2020, when the season was initially scheduled for eight games each but was cut short due to the COVID-19 pandemic) to ten games (in 2022).

SANFL
In the South Australian National Football League, season length has varied from twelve games to 22. Since 2015, teams have played 18 games per season.

WAFL
The West Australian Football League has existed within Western Australia under various names since 1885, and until the 1980s was of equivalent standard to the VFL and SANFL. Its season was originally around six to nine games in length, later increasing to 21 games, and from 2018 is 18 games. However,  in 2020 each team played only 8 home-and-away games due to the COVID-19 pandemic delaying the start until July.

VFA/VFL

1897–1995
From the time of the formation of the Victorian Football League in 1896 until it was dissolved in 1995, the VFA was the second-tier club competition in Victoria. Its home-and-away season varied erratically from 12 to 22 games in length.

1996–present

After 1995, the VFA was replaced by the current Victorian Football League (VFL), which serves as a state league and feeder to the AFL.

Basketball
Domestic basketball leagues outside of North American professional basketball have shorter seasons, typically a home-and-away regular season, with the top teams qualifying to the playoffs. Some other teams still play in continental tournaments outside of their domestic leagues, while most still play other domestic competitions.

British Basketball League 
In 2013, Mersey Tigers became the first top-flight British basketball team to go a whole season winless.

This record of 0–33 in the regular season of the 2012–13 BBL Championship, was completed with a 90–57 loss away to Glasgow Rocks, but can also be extended to include their complete season of 0–35 (defeats in the first round of the BBL Cup and BBL Trophy).

The defeat in the BBL Trophy was also significant because they fell at this stage to EBL Division One side, Worthing Thunder, and in doing so, it was the first time a BBL side had been knocked out from a competition by an EBL team.

They also currently hold the longest losing streak of 34 consecutive defeats in the BBL Championship.

EuroLeague 
The EuroLeague, the top continental basketball league in Europe, has had seen numerous tournament format changes. Starting in the 2016–17 EuroLeague, each team has played 30 regular season games, with each team playing every team. From 2000 to 2016, teams were split into groups, and played 10 teams starting when ULEB handled the league. From 1991 to 1996, FIBA expanded the original competition and had a 14-game regular season. From 1996 to 2000, there were two group stages, each with 10 games each. These are the teams that finished winless in the regular season stage since 1991 (excluding 1996 to 2000):

 1993–94 Guilford Kings (0–14)
 2001–02 London Towers (0–14)
 1997–98 FC Porto (0–16)

National Basketball League (Australia) 
The National Basketball League (Australia) has played from 18 games in its first season, later increased to 33, and then reduced to the current 28 games. Only the 1988 Geelong Supercats lost all 24 of their regular season games.

Philippine Basketball Association 
Unlike basketball leagues elsewhere, the Philippine Basketball Association (PBA) usually play 3 tournaments (or "conferences") in sequence. Each team usually plays the other teams at least once in a conference, so the minimum number of games a team plays depends on how many teams there are, historically 8 to 10, but now currently 12. No team has lost all of its games in every conference in a season, although there are instances that a team did lost all of its games in a conference. These are, from 1981 and excluding guest teams:

 1982 U/Tex Wranglers in the PBA Invitational Championship (0–4)
 Not all teams are invited in the Invitational Championship.
 1984 Country Fair Hotdogs in the PBA Second All-Filipino Conference (0–11)
 As all teams qualified to the playoffs, Country Fair lost two more games to end up with a 0–13 record.
 1990 Pepsi Hotshots in the PBA Third Conference (0–10)
 Pepsi finished 2–28 (0.067 winning percentage), winning once in each of the other 2 conferences, the worst end-of-season record in the PBA.
 1995 Ginebra San Miguel in the PBA Governors' Cup (0–10)
 1999 Pop Cola 800s in the PBA Governors' Cup (0–8)
 2011 Air21 Express in the PBA Governors' Cup (0–8)
 2011–12 Shopinas.com Clickers in the PBA Philippine Cup (0–14)
 Air21 and Shopinas.com's winless runs came at consecutive conferences.
 2014–15 Blackwater Elite in the PBA Philippine Cup (0–11)
 2017 Kia Picanto in the PBA Governors' Cup (0–11)
 2021 Blackwater Bossing in the PBA Philippine Cup (0–11)
 In addition, Blackwater earlier lost eight consecutive in the previous conference, breaking the record of the PBA's losing streak at 19.

Cricket

County cricket

In English first-class county cricket, which has a history dating back to the early nineteenth century and was until the middle twentieth century up to the highest standard of the game, seasons have varied in length. Before the 1880s, they were generally less than ten matches in length and some "first-class" counties played only against one or two different opponents, so that a team losing all its games was not uncommon. Between 1887 and 1929, seasons were gradually increased in length to a standard twenty-eight matches for all counties. However, because of the development and popularity of one-day cricket, seasons have been reduced to twenty-four games in 1969 and twenty in 1972, though this was increased by two in 1977 and 1983. With an increase to four days for all games, sixteen or seventeen games have been played since 1993.

Also, because of improvements to pitches via the heavy roller and covering to protect from rain, the proportion of games "drawn" (not finished) has steadily risen since the 1870s.

Only two county teams have ever finished a season with only losses in a program of eight or more games:

Teams losing or drawing every game in a first-class county season have been rather less exceptional, though by no means frequent:

There were no completely winless seasons in the Sunday League limited-overs competition during its history from 1969 to 2009.

International first-class cricket
With the exception of the Sheffield Shield since the 1970s, most first-class cricket competitions outside England have either been knock-outs or of such short length that it becomes an everyday occurrence for a team to lose all its games. Some, such as the Ranji Trophy and most seasons of the Quaid-e-Azam Trophy, have indeed been knockout competitions, which typically use first innings lead to decide if a match is unfinished.

There have still be some notable winless sequences in non-English first-class cricket:
 in the 1981–1982 Quaid-e-Azam Trophy, Karachi lost all nine of its matches
 between 1959–1960 and 1986–1987, Jammu and Kashmir played a total of 115 games without a win

International one-day and Twenty20 cricket
In the 2012–13 season of the Australian Big Bash League, the Sydney Thunder completed an imperfect season where they lost all their eight games despite possessing the likes of Chris Gayle.

Esports

Overwatch League
The Shanghai Dragons lost all 40 of their games in the inaugural 2018 season of the Overwatch League. They also lost their first two games of the second season, for a streak of 42 losses before defeating Boston Uprising on February 22, 2019.

Ice hockey

Ukrainian Hockey Championship 
Winless seasons occurred frequently in the Ukrainian Hockey Championship, the top-level ice hockey league in Ukraine. The longest series belongs to HK Dniprovski Vovky who lost all 30 games in the regulation time in the 2007–08 season. SDYuShOR Sokil, the academy team of HC Sokil Kyiv, had three winless seasons (1999–2000, 2004–05, and 2006–07). Four more teams completed a season without winning a single game: Ivars Kyiv lost all 12 games in 1996–97, Kryzynka II, the second team of HK Kryzynka Kiev (playing in the same league as the main team), tied 1 and lost 13 games out of 14 in 1998–99, HC Khimik Sieverodonetsk lost all 16 games in 2003–04, and VIM-Berkut lost all 10 games in 2009–10.

Netball 
Central Pulse
During the 2008 ANZ Championship season, Central Pulse suffered a winless season. The only point they gained was by default. In their Round 10 match against West Coast Fever, a leaky roof at Challenge Stadium saw the match called off and declared a draw. Each team received one point. Pulse nearly went two seasons without a win. However, after 24 games, Pulse eventually won their first ever match when they defeated the reigning champions, New South Wales Swifts, 53–52 in a 2009 Round 13 match at the Te Rauparaha Arena.

Adelaide Thunderbirds
During the 2018 Suncorp Super Netball season, Adelaide Thunderbirds lost all 14 of their 14 games.

Rugby league

Great Britain
In the Rugby Football League Championship, teams initially played a variable number of games, with the maximum ranging over time from 26 to 38, and some teams playing as few as fourteen. In more modern times the fixture list has been standardised at 26 games per team.

As a result of this fairly lengthy schedule, it has been almost impossible for British rugby league teams to lose all their games, with the only exception being during World War II's so-called "Wartime emergency League" when teams were often able to arrange no more than ten games and some as few as five. The only four winless seasons since normal competition resumed after the war have been in the second and third divisions of the Championship.

In 2018, West Wales Raiders set a number of Rugby League records for futility on course to losing all 26 games, including the largest point differential (-1930 points), most points conceded (2106) and largest average number of points conceded per game (81). In addition, they were on the receiving end of Rugby League's largest ever defeat – a 144–0 loss to York City Knights.

New South Wales Rugby Football League/National Rugby League
In the New South Wales Rugby Football League, the ancestor of today's National Rugby League, seasons were initially between eight (in the event of Kangaroo tours) and sixteen games long, so that a very bad team could go through a season with only losses. As a result of the expansion of the NSWRL from 1947 onwards, the season has been lengthened gradually with a few intermissions. The following NSWRFL teams up to 1966 did not win a single game:

Since 1967, NSWRFL and later NSWRL, ARL and NRL seasons have been between 22 and 26 games long; thus it is much less likely a very bad team could lose every single one of its games.

Brisbane Rugby League
The Brisbane Rugby League premiership began in 1909 and continued in varying forms until 1996, after which it was superseded by the Queensland Cup. Between the 1930s and the 1960s it was of comparable standard to the New South Wales Rugby Football League, but subsequently a huge drain of players to Sydney eroded the standard of play. Before World War II seasons were typically no more than twelve games long, so that a very bad team could easily fail to win a game; however as the competition grew it was expanded to 21 games, which made winless seasons much less likely.

Rugby union
Super Rugby, the Southern Hemisphere's principal club competition, has seen two teams go through an entire season with no wins or draws. Both seasons were in the competition's past incarnations of Super 12 and Super 14, each name reflecting the number of competing teams.

Under both Super 12 (1996–2005) and Super 14 (2006–2010) formats, each team played all other teams once, resulting in seasons of 11 and then 13 games. The competition became Super Rugby with the addition of a 15th team in 2011. The season format was also heavily revamped; the regular season now consists of 16 matches.

The Super 12 and Super 14 eras each saw one team finish a season with only losses; both teams with this dubious distinction are from South Africa. In 2002, the Bulls, based in Pretoria, finished with 11 losses from 11 matches. The other imperfect season was that of the Johannesburg-based Lions in the final season of the Super 14 format in 2010, who lost all 13 of their matches, while ending up with a final points difference of negative 300.

In 2018, the Sydney Rays finished the National Rugby Championship regular season with 0 wins and 0 draws in 7 games.

In 2019, the Austin Elite finished the Major League Rugby regular season with 0 wins and draws in 16 games. It was part of a 22 match winless streak that started in 2018 and ended with the final match of the 2020 before the season was cancelled by the Covid-19 pandemic.

Other sports
In many sports winless seasons may be the norm for many, or even most, competitors; particularly those where the competition does not take place in the form of discrete 1-on-1 matches, such as running.

Notes
In the 1944 under-19 wartime competition that replaced the senior competition between 1942 and that season due to the player drain of World War II, South Fremantle lost all nineteen of their games.

References

Lists of worsts
Sport-related lists